Ernest Fernyhough (24 December 1908 – 16 August 1993) was a British Labour Party politician who served as a Member of Parliament (MP) for 32 years.

Political career
Fernyhough worked for the National Union of Distributive and Allied Workers from 1936 to 1947.

In 1947, Fernyhough was elected Member of Parliament for the Labour stronghold of Jarrow in a by-election caused by the death of Ellen Wilkinson - and held the seat until he retired in 1979.

Fernyhough was Parliamentary Private Secretary to Prime Minister Harold Wilson from 1964 and a junior minister for Employment and Productivity from 1967 to 1969. He was also a member of the Council of Europe from 1970 to 1973.

Personal life
In 1934, Fernyhough married Ethel Edwards, and the couple had two sons and a daughter. The oldest John Fernyhough died in June 2020 aged 82 and the youngest Margaret (Married surname Sutcliffe) is still currently alive, with youngest child Andy Sutcliffe .
Ernest had 2 older brothers

References

 Times Guide to the House of Commons, October 1974

External links
 

1908 births
1993 deaths
Labour Party (UK) MPs for English constituencies
Members of the Privy Council of the United Kingdom
Ministers in the Wilson governments, 1964–1970
Parliamentary Private Secretaries to the Prime Minister
UK MPs 1945–1950
UK MPs 1950–1951
UK MPs 1951–1955
UK MPs 1955–1959
UK MPs 1959–1964
UK MPs 1964–1966
UK MPs 1966–1970
UK MPs 1970–1974
UK MPs 1974
UK MPs 1974–1979